Takami is both a Japanese surname and a given name. Notable people with the name include:

Given name
, Japanese illustrator, game creator, character designer and animator
, Japanese author
, Japanese long-distance runner
, Japanese actress
, Japanese politician

Surname
, Japanese boxer
, Japanese Roman Catholic prelate
, Japanese novelist and poet
, Japanese professional golfer
, Japanese author and journalist
, Japanese professional shogi player
, founder of the Asian Rural Institute (ARI) in Japan
, Japanese baseball player

Fictional characters
, fictional character from the media-mix project Love Live! Sunshine!!
, fictional siblings from the anime Deadman Wonderland
, a fictional character from My Hero Academia

See also
 Mount Takami
 Takami Dam, dam in Hokkaidō, Japan

Japanese-language surnames
Japanese unisex given names